Oscarville may refer to:

 Oscarville, Alaska, a census-designated place in Bethel Census Area
 Oscarville, Georgia, a former town now submerged within Lake Lanier

See also
 Oscar Township, Otter Tail County, Minnesota, a township
 Óscar Villa (disambiguation), a name shared by two Mexican footballers